Buffy the Vampire Slayer Season Twelve: The Reckoning is the sequel to the Season Eleven comic book series, a canonical continuation of the television series Buffy the Vampire Slayer. The series was published by Dark Horse Comics and began on June 20, 2018. The series consists of four issues, co-written by creator Joss Whedon and Christos Gage, and illustrated by Georges Jeanty. It is the final season of the Buffy the Vampire Slayer canonical comic book series.

A reboot of the comics set in the present day is currently being published by BOOM! Studios. The series began on January 23, 2019.

Publication

Single issues

Trade paperbacks

References

External links
 Buffy the Vampire Slayer at Dark Horse Comics

Season 12
Season 12
Horror comics
Sequel comics
LGBT-related comics
2018 in comics